Zeichner is a surname. Notable people with the surname include:

 Daniel Zeichner (born 1958), English Labour Party politician
 Kenneth Zeichner (born ), American educationist

See also
 Zechner

Surnames of German origin